Electronic music is music made with electronics.

Electronic music may also refer to:

Electronic dance music, electronic dance and pop music such as drum and bass, trance and techno
Electronica, Electrosion-genre popular music, usually groove-based
Electronic musical instrument,  is a musical instrument that produces its sounds using electronics.
Electronic (band)

See also 
List of electronic music genres
Electronic rock (disambiguation)